Chris "The Heathen" Valagao is a heavy metal musician, best known as the front man for Canadian speed/thrash metal band Zimmers Hole. Chris is accomplished SPFX artist and pyrotechnician for film and television, director and producer of many music videos and a builder of custom motorcycles. He is of Portuguese and Norwegian heritage.

Background
Valagao is the founding front man (along with Jed Simon and Byron Stroud from Strapping Young Lad and drummer Steve Wheeler) for Canadian speed/thrash metal band Zimmers Hole. He has recorded 3 albums with the band. During his career, Valagao has performed backing vocals on several of Devin Townsend's and Strapping Young Lad's albums. During that time he has built a strong friendship with Townsend.

In 2012, Valagao joined traditional heavy metal group West of Hell and released the debut album Spiral Empire. West of Hell followed up with a headlining tour across Canada and New Zealand in support for the album.

Nicknames
During his career, Valagao has adopted several "nicknames", most notably "The Heathen". Other nicknames include:
"Dr. Heathen Hooch"
"E.Val"
"Lorde of Ass-Fire"

Discography
Valagao has performed on the following albums.

With Zimmers Hole
Bound by Fire (1997)
Legion of Flames (2001)
When You Were Shouting at the Devil...We Were in League With Satan (2008)

With Strapping Young Lad
Heavy as a Really Heavy Thing (1994)
City (1997)
Strapping Young Lad (2003)
Alien (2005)
The New Black (2006)

With Devin Townsend
Ocean Machine: Biomech (1997)
Infinity (1998)
Physicist (2000)
Synchestra (2006)

With Mechanism
Inspired Horrific (2009)

With West of Hell
Spiral Empire (2012)
With Memorain
 Evolution (2012)

References 

Canadian heavy metal singers
Year of birth missing (living people)
Living people
Place of birth missing (living people)
Canadian people of Norwegian descent
Canadian people of Portuguese descent